Hưng Thịnh is a commune in Bảo Lạc District, Cao Bằng province, Vietnam.

In 2019, the estimated population was 2,714, and the population density was 57 people/km².

References

Districts of Cao Bằng province